Silvius gigantulus is a species of horse fly in the family Tabanidae.

Distribution
Canada, United States, Mexico.

References

Tabanidae
Insects described in 1872
Diptera of North America
Taxa named by Hermann Loew